Heteropsyche is a genus of moths in the Epipyropidae family.

Species
Heteropsyche micromorpha Perkins, 1905
Heteropsyche poecilochroma Perkins, 1905
Heteropsyche stenomorpha Perkins, 1905

References

Epipyropidae
Zygaenoidea genera